Zhaotong is a prefecture-level city located in the northeast corner of Yunnan province, China, bordering the provinces of Guizhou to the south and southeast and Sichuan to the northeast, north, and west.

History  
Zhaotong has historic and cultural links to the Shu (Sichuan basin) region. Yi people consider Zhaotong to be their homeland (called Zizipuwu). Zhaotong was part of Zhuti County (朱提縣) during Han to Tang dynasties. Zhaotong belonged to the Nanzhao then Dali Kingdom until the Mongols destroyed the latter in the 13th century. During the Yuan Dynasty, it became the Wumeng Commandery (乌蒙路), during which many Hui Muslims settled in the area. During the Qing dynasty, local tusi chieftains were removed, and the region was renamed Zhaotong Prefecture.

Climate 

Influenced by the low latitude and moderate elevation, Zhaotong has a temperate subtropical highland climate (Köppen Cwb), with cool, dry winters, and warm, humid summers. A great majority of the year's rainfall occurs from May to September.

Population

Demography 
The prefecture, almost exclusively agricultural, is one of the poorest in China, which led the authorities to encourage young people to migrate to eastern and southern parts of China to find work. For the year 2003, the number of emigrants was 650,000.

The government wanted the number to increase by 50,000 in 2004.

Religion 
It is the seat of the Latin Catholic Apostolic Prefecture of Zhaotong.

Economy 
The main industries in the prefecture are mining, tobacco and cement manufacturing

Zhaotong has some of the largest lignite sources in China. The 18,000-capacity Yuanbaoshan Stadium is also located in the city. It hosts many events, for example athletic events such as soccer matches.

Transport 
Zhaotong Airport (ZAT), flight destination to Kunming, Chengdu, Chongqing, Beijing, Guiyang
Train service to Kunming, Chengdu, Guangzhou
Zhaotong is connected to the Chongqing-Kunming National Highway network.
China National Highway 213
G85 Yinchuan–Kunming Expressway

Zhaotong has several bridges over the Jinsha River, an upstream section of the Yangtze.

Administrative divisions

See also 
 Xiangjiaba Dam
 Xiluodu Dam

References 

Zhaotong Community Development Program - Norwegian Embassy

External links 

Zhaotong Official Official Website
Zhaotong city map
Further information

 
Cities in Yunnan